Karen Hargate (born 14 October 1972) is a British gymnast. She competed in five events at the 1988 Summer Olympics. She was the youngest participant during the 1988 games. Hargate was awarded a Master Gymnasts, Women's Artistic honorary award by British Gymnastics.

References

External links
 

1972 births
Living people
British female artistic gymnasts
Olympic gymnasts of Great Britain
Gymnasts at the 1988 Summer Olympics
Sportspeople from St Andrews
20th-century British women